Dera Bugti is a district within the Balochistan province of Pakistan. It was established as a separate district in 1983.

Administration
The district is administratively subdivided into Four sub-divisions, these are:
 Pirkoh
 Dera Bugti
 Phelawagh
 Sui

Demography
At the time of the 2017 census the district had a population of 313,110, of which 165,056 were males and 148,053 females. Rural population was 212,745 (67.95%) while the urban population was 100,365 (32.05%). The literacy rate was 26.55% - the male literacy rate was 41.52% while the female literacy rate was 9.35%. 82 people in the district were from religious minorities.

At the time of te 2017 census, 96.04% of the population spoke Balochi, 1.14% Pashto and 1.07% Saraiki as their first language.

See also
 Dilbar Mat

References

Bibliography

External links

 Dera Bugti District at www.balochistan.gov.pk
 District Dera Bugti at www.balochistanpolice.gov.pk
Ansar Burney Trust - Information on the Human Rights situation in Dera Bugti and Kohlu
Subdivision list with populations

 
Districts of Pakistan
Districts of Balochistan, Pakistan